It is held annually in mid-September at the Bandaranaike Memorial International Conference Hall in Colombo, Sri Lanka. This Book Fair is organised by the Sri Lanka Book Publishers’ Association.

22nd edition of Colombo International Book Fair begins on September 18 and will last till September 27. Organizers have arranged special COVID19 safety measures. CIBF is the Sri Lanka’s largest book Exhibition.

References

External links
Sri Lanka Book Publishers' Association
2020 CIBF Dates

Book fairs in Sri Lanka
Annual events in Sri Lanka